Bhismaknagar is an archeological site in Indian state of Arunachal Pradesh. It is located near Roing in Lower Dibang Valley district. The remains are generally ascribed to the rule of the Sutiyas, a Bodo-Kachari (Tibeto-Burmese) ethnic group who ruled over the region of Sadiya from 11th to 16th Century CE.

Etymology
The name Bhismaknagar was first observed in the Assam District Gazetteer of the year 1928—reference to a work by the 16th-century seer Sankardev that was popular in the Sadiya region (which eventually found its way into the later Chutia chronicles.)

Historically, the region was known as Sadhayapura (the rulers being Sadhayapur-ishwar) as per copper inscriptions and the fort formed part of the capital region of the Chutia king Laksminarayana, also known as Che-lung in Tai Buranjis (meaning "Great City" in English).

Location
 
It is located in Lower Dibang Valley district. The campus of the old city is spread over an area of 2500 acres.

History

Bhismaknagar is an important ancient archeological site. The site must have been a stronghold of the Chutias. The ruins have been dated between the 11th-15th centuries. Bhismaknagar has been identified with Sadhayapuri (or Svadhayapuri), the political centre of the Chutia Kingdom. Based on an inscriptions on brick, it is assumed to have been the capital of Chutia king Lakṣmīnārāyaṇa, of the early 15th century. Paleographical analysis supports this dating.

Architecture

The fort, with its fortifications and buildings, is built of fired bricks. The fortified city is spread over an area of 10 square km. The wall is 4.5 meters high and 6 meters wide, made using granite stone (6-9 courses) and bricks on the east, west and south directions. In the north, the Mishmi hills provided a natural barrier. Although very less excavation has been carried out by the Arunachal government, preliminary excavations have revealed three tanks and two gates in the eastern and western directions.

The Bhismaknagar central complex extended over an area of 1860 square meters and displays three halls, six ingresses and two extension rooms. There is also a 2 meters high stone wall inside the complex. The architecture of the fort displays the medieval culture. While quarrying the fort the enormous pieces of work of art like potteries, terracotta figurines, terracotta plaques and decorative tiles were preserved.

Gallery

Notes

References

 
 
 
 
 
 
 

Villages in Lower Dibang Valley district
Archaeological sites in Arunachal Pradesh